CHIK-FM is a French-language radio station located in Quebec City, Quebec, Canada.

Owned and operated by Bell Media, it broadcasts on 98.9 MHz with an effective radiated power of 41,000 watts (class C1) using an omnidirectional antenna. The station's transmitter is located at Mount Bélair.

The station has a mainstream rock format and is part of the "Énergie" network which operates across Quebec.

CHIK started operations on July 29, 1982, as a sister station to the now-defunct CJRP and originally had an easy listening format, similar to CITF-FM and CHOI-FM as per their respective conditions of licence. CHIK switched to a CHR format a few years after opening because there were too many easy listening stations in the Quebec City radio market.

Since 2011, CHIK has more local programming than other Énergie stations around Quebec, with local DJs from 5:30 a.m.-8 p.m. weekdays and 6 a.m.-7 p.m. weekends.

References

External links
 Énergie 98.9
 

Hik
Hik
Hik
Hik
Radio stations established in 1982
1982 establishments in Quebec